The 14th Annual Anugerah Musik Indonesia was held on July 6, 2011, at the Ballroom Central Park in Tanjung Duren Selatan, West Jakarta. The show was broadcast live on RCTI and was hosted by Okky Lukman, Raffi Ahmad and Pica Priscilla.

The show was a collaboration between Anugerah Musik Indonesia Foundation and RCTI. The theme of the show was Mahakarya Musik Indonesia. Musicians, singers, and composers were nominated for 46 different categories awards. Besides the categories used in previous years, this year will also have the category Pop Trendy, a subdivision of the pre-existing pop category.

Irma Darmawangsa became the most-nominated artist in Anugerah Musik Indonesia history for the nominations with eleven times, nevertheless Darmawangsa taking home with empty-handed. Kotak became the biggest winner of the night with four wins of eight nominations, including "Best of the Best Album" for Energi, "Best Pop Song" for "Pelan-Pelan Saja", and "Best Pop Duo/Group". Other winners included Agnes Monica, Sandhy Sondoro, Evie Tamala, and Cici Paramida, who won three awards. Umay Shahab only took home two trophies each.

Elfa Secioria received the "AMI Legend Award" for a musician who has a very great service to world of Indonesian music, both of national and international.

Host/presenters 
 Okky Lukman
 Raffi Ahmad
 Priscilla Febrina
 co-host
 Boy William
 Karenina Sunny Halim
 Ayu Dewi
 Adi Nugroho

Nomination readers 
 Geisha
 Bondan Prakoso
 Keisha Alvaro
 Astrid Sartiasari
 D'Masiv
 Andy/Rif
 Marcell Siahaan
 Arumi Bachsin
 Giring Ganesha
 Andien
 Erwin Gutawa
 Addie MS
 Andi Rianto

Performers 
 Melinda
 Killing Me Inside
 Yuni Shara
 Iwa K
 Wali
 Dira Sugandi
 Syaharani
 Andien
 Tompi
 Glenn Fredly
 Sandhy Sondoro
 Nidji
 ST 12
 Max 5
 Coboy Junior
 Yovie Widianto
 Vidi Aldiano

Winner and nominees 
The nominees were announced on June 15, 2011.
Winners are listed first and highlighted in boldface.

Pop

Rock

Jazz/Instrumental

Dangdut

Contemporary Dangdut

Children

Production Work

Field Production Support

General

Artist with most nominations and awards 

The following artist received most nominations:

The following artist received most awards:

References

External links 
  

2011 music awards
Indonesian music awards
Anugerah Musik Indonesia